Plenum may refer to:

 Plenum chamber, a chamber intended to contain air, gas, or liquid at positive pressure
 Plenism, or Horror vacui (physics) the concept that "nature abhors a vacuum"
 Plenum (meeting), a meeting of a deliberative assembly in which all members are present; contrast with quorum
 Plenum space, enclosed spaces (in buildings) used for airflow
 Plenum cable, electrical wire permitted in plenum spaces per building codes
 Plenum Publishing Corporation, a publisher of scientific books and journals
 Plenum (physics), a space completely filled with matter
 Undergravel filters, in aquarium filtration, an open space under a layer of gravel or sand
 Air-mixing plenum, a place where ducts meet

See also
 Plenary (disambiguation), the related adjective